Samuel Hoffmann (1591, Zürich – 1648, Frankfurt), was a Baroque painter from Zurich.

Biography
According to Houbraken he travelled to Antwerp to learn painting in the studio of Rubens, and set up a workshop in Amsterdam, where he married in 1628.  He then travelled with his wife to his native Zurich where he was successful as a portrait painter. He painted for the Duke of Milan (possibly Victor Amadeus I, Duke of Savoy), and then travelled to Frankfurt where he painted a large piece for the city hall there, but he died of podagra (gout) in 1640. His wife and daughter (who was a painter) returned to Amsterdam.

According to the RKD he was in Amsterdam from  1614-1622.

Notes

References
Samuel Hoffmann on Artnet

External links

1591 births
1648 deaths
Baroque painters
Artists from Zürich